Draupadi (The Daughter Of King Drupad) is a 1931 sound film from Indian cinema. The film was a big-budget mythological production from Ardeshir Irani's Imperial Film Company following their release of the first talkie in India, Alam Ara (1931). It was directed by Bhagwati Prasad Mishra, who had made a name for himself as a photographer and painter and had worked with Irani in his Star, Majestic, Royal and Imperial Studios.  The story adaptation from Vyasa's Mahabharata and the screenplay, were by Mishra. The star cast included Prithviraj Kapoor who played the role of Arjuna, with Ermeline as Draupadi, and Khalil as Krishna. The rest of cast included Hadi, Elizer, Rustom Irani and Jilloobai. The cinematographer was Adi Irani.

The film was based on an episode from the Mahabharata showcasing Duryodhan's plans of usurping Hastinapur and his subsequent attempt at shaming the Pandavas by disrobing Draupadi's sari.

Plot
Duryodhana (Jagdish Sethi) plots to attain Hastinapur for himself and his hundred Kaurava brothers. The five  Pandavas brothers are sent to exile during which time Arjuna (Prithviraj Kapoor wins Draupadi (Ermeline) at her swayamvara. According to his mother's unintentional suggestion, the five brothers share Draupadi as their wife. On their return from banishment, the Pandavas establish themselves at Indraprastha. The Rajasuya Yagna takes place and a game of dice follows. The Kauravas cunning uncle Shakuni (Hadi) helps them win the game, wherein the Pandavas first lose their Kingdom, and then as a last wager by the oldest brother Yudhishtra, even Draupadi. When Duryodhan, with the intention of shaming the Pandavas tries to remove Draupadi's sari, it is Lord Krishna who saves her from humiliation by performing the miracle of a never-ending sari.

Cast
 Ermeline as Draupadi
Khalil  as Lord Krishna
Prithviraj Kapoor as Arjun
 Jilloobai as Kunti
 Jagdish as Duryodhana
 Hadi as Shakuna Mama
 Elizer as Yudhishtra
 Rostam Irani as Bhim
 Nayampally

Draupadi in Indian Cinema
The use of Hindu mythology in context to women, was a common feature in most films produced in the early part of the twentieth century. According to author Prem Chowdhry, Draupadi was referenced in films about eleven times between 1916 and 1944.

Silent films
Lists:
Keechaka Vadham a.k.a. Draupadi Vastrapaharanam (1916) directed by R. Nataraja Mudaliar
Draupadi Vastraharan (1920)
Sairandhari (1920) directed by Baburao Painter
Draupadi Swayamwar (1922) directed by Vishnupant Divekar
Draupadi Veni Bandhan a.k.a. Veni Bandhan (1922) directed by Vishnupant Divekar
Draupadi's Fate a.k.a. Draupadi Bhagya (1924) directed by Raghupathy Prakash.
Draupadi Vastraharan (1927) directed by Dadasaheb Phalke
Draupadi Vastraharan (1928) directed by P. Y. Altekar 
Keechak Vadh (1928) directed by Baburao Painter

Talkies
Lists:
Draupadi (1931) directed by Bhagwati Prasad Mishra
Sairandhari (1933) directed by V. Shantaram for Prabhat Film Company
Draupadi Vastrapaharanam (1934) a Tamil-language film directed by R. Padmanaban.
Draupadi Vastrapaharanam (1936) a Telugu-language film directed by Hanumappa Vishwanath Babu
Draupadi Manasamrakshnam (1936) a Telugu-language film, directed by S. Jagganath
Draupadi (1944) directed by Baburao Patel
Draupadi Vastraharan (1952) directed by W. Garcher

Soundtrack

Song List
The songs were sung by the actors in the film.

References

External links
 

1931 films
1930s Hindi-language films
Films based on the Mahabharata
Indian black-and-white films
Indian drama films
1931 drama films